Altendorf railway station is a railway station in the Swiss canton of Schwyz and municipality of Altendorf. The station is located on the Lake Zurich left-bank railway line, owned by the Swiss Federal Railways (SBB).

Layout and connections 
Altendorf has two  side platforms with two tracks ( 1–2). PostAuto Schweiz operates bus services from the station to Ziegelbrücke, Siebnen, and Pfäffikon.

Services 
 the following services stop at Altendorf:

 Zürich S-Bahn:

References

External links
 
 

Altendorf
Altendorf